The death spiral is a figure skating term used to describe a spin involving two partners in the discipline of pair skating, in which one partner lowers the other partner while the partner getting close to the ice arches backward on one foot. It was created by German professional skater Charlotte Oelschlägel and her husband Curt Newmann in the 1920s. Suzanne Morrow and Wallace Diestelmeyer from Canada were the first pair team to perform the death spiral one-handed (the man holding the woman in position with one hand), at the 1948 Olympic Games. In the 1960s, Soviet pair team Liudmila Belousova and Oleg Protopopov created three death spirals: "the backward-inside, forward-inside and forward-outside death spirals, which they originally named the Cosmic Spiral, Life Spiral and Love Spiral, respectively". The International Skating Union (ISU), the governing body that oversees figure skating, allows for variations of arm holds and pivot positions. Senior pair skating teams must perform different types of death spirals in their short programs and free skating programs.

Types
There are four types of death spirals: the forward inside death spiral, the backward outside death spiral, the backward inside death spiral, and the forward outside death spiral. The forward inside death spiral is accomplished when the man skates on a backward outside edge and the woman skates on a forward inside edge. He performs a pivot while holding her hand with the same fully extended arm as his skating foot, while she leans sideways and circles around him while her arms are also fully extended. According to Skate Canada, the forward inside death spiral is the easiest death spiral.

The backward outside spiral is executed when both partners skate on a backward outside edge. The man must hold the woman's hand with the same arm as his fully extended skating foot while performing a pivot, and she leans backward as she circles around him while her arm is fully extended. According to Skate Canada, the backward outside death spiral is the most difficult death spiral. For both forward inside and backward outside death spirals, the man can skate in any position, edge, or direction, but he must remain in the prescribed pivot position and his partner must circle around him on the prescribed edge.

The backward inside death spiral is executed when the woman leans towards the ice while her arm is fully extended and she circles around the man on a "firm backward inside edge". The forward outside death spiral is performed like the backward inside death spiral; the only difference is that the woman circles around her partner on a "firm forward outside edge".

Execution
While the woman performs "the actual death spiral", both she and her partner must complete at least one revolution, with the man's knees "clearly bent and in full pivot position". Judges begin to count revolutions when both partners "are in the actual low death spiral position". Revolutions begin when the toe the man uses to anchor onto the ice is stationary, which is necessary due to centripetal acceleration experienced during the revolutions, and ends when the woman either rises to exit the death spiral or when the man's pivot ends.

Pair skating teams must execute the prescribed types of death spirals only. Death spirals are worth more points when the man stays in a low pivot position and when the lower part of his buttocks is not higher than the upper part of the knee of his pivot foot. At the same time, the woman must skate on a clean edge, with her head and body as close to the ice surface as possible, without her head touching the ice, or without using her free hand or any part of her body to assist herself. Her body weight is supported by her partner's hold and by the force of the spiraling edge. One skate of the woman must remain on the ice. Throughout inside death spirals, her head and lowest buttock or hip must not be higher than her skating knee. Throughout outside death spirals, her head must not be higher than her skating knee, and her body-line between her head and the knee of her skating knee must have a shallow or flat arch. Her skate must remain on the ice for the duration of the death spiral; if she loses the edge and uses her boot or knee instead of her skate, the death spiral is considered ended and may be judged as a fall.

The man must be in a centered position and use a fully extended arm. Any kind of position, if the pair team's hold lasts for at least one revolution, can be counted. Variations of pivot positions, either backward or forward, are allowed, as long as his buttocks are not higher than the knee of his anchored foot.  Arm holds are also allowed. If the man's holding arm is not fully extended for one revolution, or if he does not reach the pivot position or cannot remain there for an entire revolution, the team receives no points for the death spiral.  The death spiral is considered ended at the moment the man changes the position of the pivot. Pair skaters earn a higher level of difficulty, and thus more points, for difficult entries immediately before the death spiral and exits. Entry into a death spiral starts "at the beginning of the entry curve when one partner is on one foot on the edge of the death spiral and the other partner is also on one foot or in a position such as spread eagle, shoot the duck etc." The exit begins when the man begins to bend his holding arm at the elbow and when the woman's position is vertical. Both partners must execute positions "that affect the main body core and balance" when performing difficult entries and exits. Difficult entry positions must be performed while both partners are executing the entry curve and either the man or the woman are moving from a difficult entry position to the death spiral, with no delay. Difficult exit positions can include commencing a lift immediately after the death spiral or performing a jump.

References

Works cited
 "Special Regulations & Technical Rules Single & Pair Skating and Ice Dance 2022". (S&P/ID 2022) International Skating Union. 2022. Retrieved 30 September 2022.
  "Technical Panel Handbook: Pair Skating 2022/2023" (PDF). (Tech Panel) International Skating Union. 15 July 2022. Retrieved 30 September 2022.

Figure skating elements
Pair skating